The Ripple House is a historic house in Lesterville, South Dakota. It was built in 1919, with a gable roof and a dormer. The porch was designed in the American Craftsman and Neoclassical styles, with Palladian windows. The house has been listed on the National Register of Historic Places since April 16, 1980.

References

		
National Register of Historic Places in Yankton County, South Dakota
Houses completed in 1919